Campo Formoso is a municipality in the state of Bahia in the North-East region of Brazil. It is about 248 miles from Bahia's capital Salvador. It is famous for the gems, rare stones and caves that are abundant in the area and it is the host of the cement factory, Cimpor. The city is surrounded by green mountains, and on the edge of one of them there are four transmission towers which allow the population to be connected to the Internet, TV, cable TV, wireless and phone. Campo Formoso has hot weather with temperatures of about 25 °C.

See also
List of municipalities in Bahia

References

Municipalities in Bahia